Eagle Creek State Park is an Illinois state park on  on Lake Shelbyville in Shelby County, Illinois, United States.

External links
 Eagle Creek State Park

References

State parks of Illinois
Protected areas of Shelby County, Illinois
Protected areas established in 1963
1963 establishments in Illinois